Severe Tropical Cyclone Olivia was a powerful cyclone, the 13th named storm of the 1995–96 Australian region cyclone season, which formed on 3 April 1996 to the north of Australia's Northern Territory. The storm moved generally to the southwest, gradually intensifying off Western Australia. On 8 April, Olivia intensified into a severe tropical cyclone and subsequently turned more to the south, steered by a passing trough. The storm quickly weakened over land, dissipating over the Great Australian Bight on 12 April.

During its formative stages, Olivia produced light rainfall in the Northern Territory. While offshore Western Australia, the cyclone forced oil platforms to shut down, and the combination of high winds and waves caused heavy damage to oil facilities. Onshore, Olivia's high winds damaged several small mining towns, halting operations. Every house in Pannawonica sustained some damage. One person in the town was injured by flying glass and had to be flown to receive treatment, and nine others were lightly injured. The cyclone also produced heavy rainfall and a localized storm surge. Damage was estimated "in the millions". While the storm was dissipating, rough seas in South Australia killed A$60 million (US$47.5 million) worth of farm-raised tuna at Port Lincoln. The name Olivia was retired after the season.

Meteorological history

In early April 1996, a surge in the trade winds interacted with the monsoon trough to produce an area of convection. On 2 April, the Bureau of Meteorology (BoM) first identified the system as a low to mid-level low pressure area over Indonesia north of Darwin, Australia. Despite strong wind shear, the system slowly became better organized as it moved southward, aided by improving upper-level outflow. Early on 5 April, the Joint Typhoon Warning Center (JTWC) classified the system as Tropical Cyclone 25S as the system began a westward track, steered by a building mid-level ridge to the south. Shortly thereafter, the BoM upgraded the system to a Category 1 cyclone, designating the storm as Tropical Cyclone Olivia.

In the days following Olivia's development, persistent wind shear prevented convection from developing around the center of circulation. By 8 April, an upper-level trough passed to the south of the nascent cyclone, leading to lower shear. Around the same time, the BoM upgraded Olivia to a severe tropical cyclone, assessing similar wind speeds but sustained over 10 minutes. After the storm reached this intensity, the mid-level ridge south of the cyclone began to weaken, turning Olivia toward the southwest. By 9 April, the system attained Category 4 intensity according to the BoM as it continued to strengthen. By this time, another trough bypassed the cyclone, causing Olivia to turn to the south and accelerate to the southeast.

Late on 10 April, the center of Olivia passed near Barrow Island at peak intensity. Shortly thereafter, the storm passed near Varanus Island as a high-end Category 4 or low-end Category 5 cyclone. Within several hours of passing by Varanus Island, Olivia made landfall near Mardie at peak intensity. Shortly thereafter, the storm began to weaken overland. Accelerating to the southeast, the storm became disorganized and winds decreased below hurricane-force. During the afternoon of 11 April, Olivia weakened to a tropical low over southern Australia. It moved over the Great Australian Bight and lost its identity as a gale-force low on 12 April, after it was absorbed by a trough.

Impact and aftermath
As a minimal cyclone in the Timor Sea, Olivia brought minor rainfall and gusty winds to parts of the Northern Territory. On 9 April, the fringes of the storm dropped  in the Kimberley region of Western Australia. An oil rig in the Timor Sea recorded a wind gust of  during the storm's passage. Offshore, Olivia affected the southern portion of Australia's Northwest Shelf, which had 24 oil and gas facilities. The waves also wrecked several anchors for underwater pipelines, although no lines were ruptured. On Barrow Island, the winds knocked over 30 pumpjacks, and several buildings and instruments were damaged, while high waves incurred beach erosion. Damage to offshore platforms was estimated in the millions of dollars.

A group of 17 people, initially considered missing, rode out the storm on the offshore Mackerel Island. Onshore, officials closed a portion of Highway 1 as well as other roads in the area. Ahead of the storm, hundreds of residents in older structures and mobile homes, as well as an aboriginal village near Onslow, were ordered to evacuate to safer locations. Five iron ore mines were closed during the storm's passage, forcing the 1,500 workers to return home. The disruptions from the cyclone affected about 340,000 tonnes of lost production. About 800,000 barrels of lost oil production resulted from closed offshore platforms. Oil fields reopened by 14 April.

It broke the previous peak of  set by Cyclone Trixie in 1975, and was later matched by Cyclone Vance in 1999. The high winds at Mardie Station damaged the local airport hangar and several windmills. The town's police station and medical center lost their roofs during the storm, and every house sustained some damage. Of the 82 houses in the small town, 55 lost their roof. It was estimated that Pannawonica would remain without power for three weeks. One person in town was injured by flying broken glass, who had to be airlifted to Karratha for medical attention. In nearby Yarraloola, nearly every building was damaged, and the roofs of several farm buildings were ripped off. Several other small towns in the region sustained damage to roofs, power lines, and trees, and a 24 year old roadhouse was destroyed along the Fortescue River. The storm also produced a  storm surge in localized areas. At the port of Dampier, the storm sank three boats, although no one was aboard. Damage was estimated in the "millions of dollars", according to a local newspaper, and overall, 10 people were injured.

As the remnants of Olivia moved through Australia, they dropped heavy rainfall and brought gusty winds to South Australia. At Port Lincoln, sediment stirred up by Olivia's remnants killed 60,000 farmed tuna, worth about A$60 million (US$47.5 million). The fish were in cages and died due to abnormally high oxygen levels in the water, caused by Olivia's high winds and rough waves. The remnants of Olivia later brought rainfall to the states of Victoria and Tasmania.

The name "Olivia" was later retired from the list of tropical cyclone names for the Australian region. After the storm's passage, the Royal Australian Air Force flew six generators to Pannawonica after the town was out of power for two nights, and the Western Australian government sent another 13 generators. Residents in the town received counseling to cope with the stress of the storm's aftermath.

Records
The BoM was initially unsure of the veracity of the reading, although a team at the 1999 Offshore Technology Conference presented the reading as the highest wind gust on Earth. In 2009, the World Meteorological Organization Commission for Climatology researched whether Hurricane Gustav in 2008 produced a record  gust on Pinar del Rio, Cuba; one committee member recalled the gust set during Olivia, which spurred the investigation. The reading occurred along the western edge of the eyewall, possibly related to mesovortices. Based on other similarly high wind gusts during Olivia –  observed within five minutes of the record gust – the team confirmed that the instrument was observing properly during the storm. The team confirmed that the instrument was regularly inspected and calibrated, and that the reading was during the passage of the eyewall.

On 26 January 2010, nearly 14 years later, the World Meteorological Organization announced that the wind gust was the highest recorded worldwide. The long delay was partly due to the anemometer not being owned by the BoM, and as a result the agency did not enact a follow-up investigation. Despite the high winds, the anemometer and a nearby building were not damaged due to the winds occurring over a very short time.

See also

References

External links
 Joint Typhoon Warning Center (JTWC) .
 Australian Bureau of Meteorology (TCWC's Perth, Darwin & Brisbane) .

Cyclone Olivia
1995–96 Australian region cyclone season
Category 4 Australian region cyclones
Retired Australian region cyclones